Philippe Greiss (known professionally as Phil Greiss) is a Canadian record producer, songwriter, vocal producer, multi-instrumentalist & mix engineer. Greiss's recent work includes production for artists Jason Derulo, J Balvin, Nicki Minaj, Alok, David Guetta, BTS, Will I Am, Beyoncé, Willy William, and Farina

Greiss is a 2021 ASCAP Pop Award winner for his work on Jason Derulo's “Savage Love” (2 times RIAA Platinum, #1 Billboard Hot 100, #1 Billboard Global 200, #1 Global Spotify, #1 iTunes Worldwide). He was nominated twice by the 2018 Latin Grammy Awards for his work on J Balvin & Willy William's Mi Gente (68X RIAA Platinum, Latin Grammy nomination for record of the year) and won the Latin Grammy Award for Best Urban Music Album for his work on J Balvin's "Vibras" (8 times RIAA Platinum, Latin Grammy nomination for album of the year). Greiss also received a BRITT Gold Certification for his work on David Guetta's "Goodbye" (feat. Nicki Minaj & Jason Derulo)  as well as an RIAA Gold certification for his work on David Guetta's album "7"

Career 
Greiss crafted chart toping albums and songs in France in the 2000s and 2010s such as Corneille's  “Parce qu'on vient de loin" and DIMA by Zaho. In 2017, Greiss co-produced & mixed Willy William's “Voodoo Song” which subsequently became the international hit “Mi Gente” with J Balvin. This success led to Greiss producing David Guetta & Jason Derulo's 2018 single "Goodbye"(feat Nicky Minaj). In 2019, he produced "Perras Como Tú (Ft. Tokischa)" for Latin rising star Farina, which was featured in Paramount Picture's "Miss Bala". The last few years brought more opportunities for Greiss, who co-wrote and co-produced Jason Derulo's “Savage Love”.  He recently produced Alok's “TU” and collaborated on "Metele Al Perreo" by Daddy Yankee.

Partial Discography (U.S & International)

Selected Discography (France & Europe)
Selected Discography

References

Canadian record producers
Year of birth missing (living people)
Living people